Personal identity is the unique numerical identity of a person over time. Discussions regarding personal identity typically aim to determine the necessary and sufficient conditions under which a person at one time and a person at another time can be said to be the  person, persisting through time.

In philosophy, the problem of personal identity is concerned with how one is able to identify a single person over a time interval, dealing with such questions as, "What makes it true that a person at one time is the same thing as a person at another time?" or "What kinds of things are we persons?"

In contemporary metaphysics, the matter of personal identity is referred to as the diachronic problem of personal identity. The synchronic problem concerns the question of what features and traits characterize a person at a given time. Analytic philosophy and continental philosophy both inquire about the nature of identity. Continental philosophy deals with conceptually maintaining identity when confronted by different philosophic propositions, postulates, and presuppositions about the world and its nature.

Continuity of substance

Bodily substance

One concept of personal persistence over time is simply to have continuous bodily existence. However, as the Ship of Theseus problem illustrates, even for inanimate objects there are difficulties in determining whether one physical body at one time is the same thing as a physical body at another time. With humans, over time our bodies age and grow, losing and gaining matter, and over-sufficient years will not consist of most of the matter they once consisted of. It is thus problematic to ground the persistence of personal identity over time in the continuous existence of our bodies. Nevertheless, this approach has its supporters who define humans as a biological organism and asserts the proposition that a psychological relation is not necessary for personal continuity. This personal identity ontology assumes the relational theory of life-sustaining processes instead of bodily continuity.

The teletransportation problem of Derek Parfit is designed to bring out intuitions about corporeal continuity. This thought experiment discusses cases in which a person is teleported from Earth to Mars. Ultimately, the inability to specify where on a spectrum does the transmitted person stop being identical to the initial person on Earth appears to show that having a numerically identical physical body is not the criterion for personal identity.

Mental substance
In another concept of mind, the set of cognitive faculties are considered to consist of an immaterial substance, separate from and independent of the body. If a person is then identified with their mind, rather than their body—if a person is considered to  their mind—and their mind is such a non-physical substance, then personal identity over time may be grounded in the persistence of this non-physical substance, despite the continuous change in the substance of the body it is associated with.

The mind-body problem concerns the explanation of the relationship, if any, that exists between minds, or mental processes, and bodily states or processes. One of the aims of philosophers who work in this area is to explain how a non-material mind can influence a material body and vice versa.

However, this is not uncontroversial or unproblematic, and adopting it as a solution raises questions. Perceptual experiences depend on stimuli which arrive at various sensory organs from the external world and these stimuli cause changes in mental states; ultimately causing sensation. A desire for food, for example, will tend to cause a person to move their body in a manner and in a direction to obtain food. The question, then, is how it can be possible for conscious experiences to arise out of an organ (the human brain) possessing electrochemical properties. A related problem is to explain how propositional attitudes (e.g. beliefs and desires) can cause neurons of the brain to fire and muscles to contract in the correct manner. These comprise some of the puzzles that have confronted epistemologists and philosophers of mind from at least the time of René Descartes.

Continuity of consciousness

Locke's conception

John Locke considered personal identity (or the self) to be founded on consciousness (viz. memory), and not on the substance of either the soul or the body. Chapter 27 of Book II of his Essay Concerning Human Understanding (1689), entitled "On Identity and Diversity", has been said to be one of the first modern conceptualizations of consciousness as the repeated self-identification of oneself. Through this identification, moral responsibility could be attributed to the subject and punishment and guilt could be justified, as critics such as Nietzsche would point out.

According to Locke, personal identity (the self) "depends on consciousness, not on substance" nor on the soul. We are the same person to the extent that we are conscious of the past and future thoughts and actions in the same way as we are conscious of present thoughts and actions. If consciousness is this "thought" which "goes along with the substance…which makes the same person," then personal identity is only founded on the repeated act of consciousness: "This may show us wherein personal identity consists: not in the identity of substance, but…in the identity of consciousness." For example, one may claim to be a reincarnation of Plato, therefore having the same soul substance. However, one would be the same person as Plato only if one had the same consciousness of Plato's thoughts and actions that he himself did. Therefore, self-identity is not based on the soul. One soul may have various personalities.

Neither is self-identity founded on the body substance, argues Locke, as the body may change while the person remains the same. Even the identity of animals is not founded on their body: "animal identity is preserved in identity of life, and not of substance," as the body of the animal grows and changes during its life. On the other hand, identity of humans is based on their consciousness.

However, this interesting border-case leads to this problematic thought that since personal identity is based on consciousness, and only oneself can be aware of one's consciousness, exterior human judges may never know if they are really judging—and punishing—the same person, or simply the same body. In other words, Locke argues that one may be judged only for the acts of the body, as this is what is apparent to all but God; however, we are in truth only responsible for the acts of which are conscious. This forms the basis of the insanity defense—one cannot be held accountable for acts of which one was unconscious—and therefore leads to interesting philosophical questions:

Or again:

{{quote|PERSON, as I take it, is the name for this self. Wherever a man finds what he calls himself, there, I think, another may say is the same person. It is a forensic term, appropriating actions and their merit; and so belong only to intelligent agents, capable of a law, and happiness, and misery. This personality extends itself beyond present existence to what is past, only by consciousness,—whereby it becomes concerned and accountable; owns and imputes to itself past actions, just upon the same ground and for the same reason as it does the present. All which is founded in a concern for happiness, the unavoidable concomitant of consciousness; that which is conscious of pleasure and pain, desiring that that self that is conscious should be happy. And therefore whatever past actions it cannot reconcile or APPROPRIATE to that present self by consciousness, it can be no more concerned in it than if they had never been done: and to receive pleasure or pain, i.e. reward or punishment, on the account of any such action, is all one as to be made happy or miserable in its first being, without any demerit at all. For, supposing a MAN punished now for what he had done in another life, whereof he could be made to have no consciousness at all, what difference is there between that punishment and being CREATED miserable? And therefore, conformable to this, the apostle tells us, that, at the great day, when every one shall 'receive according to his doings, the secrets of all hearts shall be laid open.' The sentence shall be justified by the consciousness all person shall have, that THEY THEMSELVES, in what bodies soever they appear, or what substances soever that consciousness adheres to, are the SAME that committed those actions, and deserve that punishment for them.}}

Henceforth, Locke's conception of personal identity founds it not on the substance or the body, but in the "same continued consciousness", which is also distinct from the soul since the soul may have no consciousness of itself (as in reincarnation). He creates a third term between the soul and the body. For Locke, the body may change, while consciousness remains the same. Therefore, personal identity, for Locke, is not in the body but in consciousness.

Philosophical intuition
Bernard Williams presents a thought experiment appealing to the intuitions about what it is to be the same person in the future. The thought experiment consists of two approaches to the same experiment.

For the first approach Williams suggests that suppose that there is some process by which subjecting two persons to it can result in the two persons have "exchanged" bodies. The process has put into the body of person B the memories, behavioral dispositions, and psychological characteristics of the person who prior to undergoing the process belonged to person A; and conversely with person B. To show this one is to suppose that before undergoing the process person A and B are asked to which resulting person, A-Body-Person or B-Body-Person, they wish to receive a punishment and which a reward. Upon undergoing the process and receiving either the punishment or reward, it appears to that A-Body-Person expresses the memories of choosing who gets which treatment as if that person was person B; conversely with B-Body-Person.

This sort of approach to the thought experiment appears to show that since the person who expresses the psychological characteristics of person A to be person A, then intuition is that psychological continuity is the criterion for personal identity.

The second approach is to suppose that someone is told that one will have memories erased and then one will be tortured. Does one need to be afraid of being tortured? The intuition is that people will be afraid of being tortured, since it will still be one despite not having one's memories. Next, Williams asked one to consider several similar scenarios.
Intuition is that in all the scenarios one is to be afraid of being tortured, that it is still one's self despite having one's memories erased and receiving new memories. However, the last scenario is an identical scenario to the one in the first scenario.

In the first approach, intuition is to show that one's psychological continuity is the criterion for personal identity, but in second approach, intuition is that it is one's bodily continuity that is the criterion for personal identity. To resolve this conflict Williams feels one's intuition in the second approach is stronger and if he was given the choice of distributing a punishment and a reward he would want his body-person to receive the reward and the other body-person to receive the punishment, even if that other body-person has his memories.

Psychological continuity
In psychology, personal continuity, also called personal persistence or self-continuity, is the uninterrupted connection concerning a particular person of their private life and personality. Personal continuity is the union affecting the facets arising from personality in order to avoid discontinuities from one moment of time to another time.

Personal continuity is an important part of identity; this is the process of ensuring that the qualities of the mind, such as self-awareness, sentience, sapience, and the ability to perceive the relationship between oneself and one's environment, are consistent from one moment to the next. Personal continuity is the property of a continuous and connected period of timeLocke, John. "On Identity and Diversity." Ch. 27 in An Essay Concerning Human Understanding 1-3. pp. 46, 69. and is intimately related to do with a person's body or physical being in a single four-dimensional continuum. Associationism, a theory of how ideas combine in the mind, allows events or views to be associated with each other in the mind, thus leading to a form of learning. Associations can result from contiguity, similarity, or contrast. Through contiguity, one associates ideas or events that usually happen to occur at the same time. Some of these events form an autobiographical memory in which each is a personal representation of the general or specific events and personal facts.

Ego integrity is the psychological concept of the ego's accumulated assurance of its capacity for order and meaning. Ego identity is the accrued confidence that the inner sameness and continuity prepared in the past are matched by the sameness and continuity of one's meaning for others, as evidenced in the promise of a career. Body and ego control organ expressionsThinking Bodies. Edited by Juliet Flower MacCannell, Laura ZakarinThe Four Temperaments. By Rudolf Steiner. and of the other attributes of the dynamics of a physical system to face the emotions of ego deathAshford, José B., Craig Winston LeCroy, and Kathy L. Lortie. Human Behavior in the Social Environment: A Multidimensional Perspective. in circumstances which can summon, sometimes, anti-theonymistic self-abandonment.de Caussade, Jean-Pierre. Abandonment to Divine Providence.Cohen, Donna, and Carl Eisdorfer. The Loss of Self.Narayan, R. K. The Guide.

Identity continuum

It has been argued from the nature of sensations and ideas that there is no such thing as a permanent identity. Daniel Shapiro asserts that one of four major views on identity does not recognize a "permanent identity" and instead thinks of "thoughts without a thinker"—"a consciousness shell with drifting emotions and thoughts but no essence". According to him this view is based on the Buddhist concept of anatta, "a continuously evolving flow of awareness." Malcolm David Eckel states that "the self changes at every moment and has no permanent identity"—it is a "constant process of changing or becoming;" a "fluid ever-changing self."

 Bundle theory of the self 

David Hume undertook looking at the mind–body problem. Hume also investigated a person's character, the relationship between human and animal nature, and the nature of agency. Hume pointed out that we tend to think that we are the same person we were five years ago. Though we've changed in many respects, the same person appears present now as was present then. We might start thinking about which features can be changed without changing the underlying self. Hume, however, denies that there is a distinction between the various features of a person and the mysterious self that supposedly bears those features. When we begin introspecting:[We] always stumble on some particular perception or other.… I may venture to affirm of the rest of mankind, that they are nothing but a bundle or collection of different perceptions which succeed each other with an inconceivable rapidity and are in perpetual flux and movement.It is plain that in the course of our thinking, and in the constant revolution of our ideas, our imagination runs easily from one idea to any other that resembles it, and that this quality alone is to the fancy a sufficient bond and association. It is likewise evident that as the senses, in changing their objects, are necessitated to change them regularly, and take them as they lie contiguous to each other, the imagination must by long custom acquire the same method of thinking, and run along the parts of space and time in conceiving its objects.

Note in particular that, in Hume's view, these perceptions do not belong to anything. Hume, similar to the Buddha, compares the soul to a commonwealth, which retains its identity not by virtue of some enduring core substance, but by being composed of many different, related, and yet constantly changing elements. The question of personal identity then becomes a matter of characterizing the loose cohesion of one's personal experience.

In short, what matters for Hume is not that 'identity' exists, but the fact that the relations of causation, contiguity, and resemblances obtain among the perceptions. Critics of Hume state that in order for the various states and processes of the mind to seem unified, there must be something which perceives their unity, the existence of which would be no less mysterious than a personal identity. Hume solves this by considering substance as engendered by the togetherness of its properties.

No-self theory

The "no-self theory" holds that the self cannot be reduced to a bundle because the concept of a self is incompatible with the idea of a bundle. Propositionally, the idea of a bundle implies the notion of bodily or psychological relations that do not in fact exist. James Giles, a principal exponent of this view, argues that the no-self or eliminativist theory'' and the bundle or reductionist theory agree about the non-existence of a substantive self. The reductionist theory, according to Giles, mistakenly resurrects the idea of the self in terms of various accounts about psychological relations. The no-self theory, on the other hand, "lets the self lie where it has fallen". This is because the no-self theory rejects all theories of the self, even the bundle theory. On Giles' reading, Hume is actually a no-self theorist and it is a mistake to attribute to him a reductionist view like the bundle theory. Hume's assertion that personal identity is a fiction supports this reading, according to Giles.

The Buddhist view of personal identity is also a no-self theory rather than a reductionist theory, because the Buddha rejects attempts to reconstructions in terms of consciousness, feelings, or the body in notions of an eternal/permanent, unchanging Self, since our thoughts, personalities and bodies are never the same from moment to moment, as specifically explained in Śūnyatā.

According to this line of criticism, the sense of self is an evolutionary artifact, which saves time in the circumstances it evolved for. But sense of self breaks down when considering some events such as memory loss, dissociative identity disorder, brain damage, brainwashing, and various thought experiments. When presented with imperfections in the intuitive sense of self and the consequences to this concept which rely on the strict concept of self, a tendency to mend the concept occurs, possibly because of cognitive dissonance.

Experimental Philosophy

Since the 21st century, philosophers have also been using the methods of psychological science to better understand philosophical intuitions. This empirical approach to philosophy is known as Experimental philosophy or "xPhi" for short. Studies in xPhi have found various psychological factors predict variance even in philosophers views about personal identity.

Moral Self Theory

Findings from xPhi suggest that moral intuitions may have a major influence on our intuitions about personal identity. For example, some experimental philosophers have found that when a person undergoes a dramatic change (e.g., traumatic brain injury), people are less likely to think that the person is the "same" after their dramatic change if the person became morally worse (as opposed to morally better). Data like this support the "moral self hypothesis", that "moral traits are essential" to personal identity, with some going as far as saying that, "When someone undergoes dramatic mental change, their numerical identity—whether they’re the same person as they were before—can seem to become disrupted".

Numeric vs. Qualitative Identity

While the direction of change (e.g., moral improvement vs. moral deterioration) has been found to cause substantial shifts in peoples' judgments about personal identity, multiple studies find that none of these shifts constitute thinking that someone is numerically non-identical to the person they were before the change—such that the person before the change is one person and the person after the change is an entirely separate second person: when people were asked how many people are described in cases of dramatic moral change, the vast majority of answers were "one" (rather than two or more). This aligns with more recent evidence that these shifts in intuitions about personal identity are about qualitative identity (i.e., how similar one is to a prior version of themselves) rather than numerical identity (i.e., whether there are two or more people described by cases in which a person undergoes a dramatic change).

See also
 Right to personal identity

Identity 
 Abstract object
 Nominal identity
 Open individualism
 Personal life
 Self-Schema
 Self (philosophy)
 Self-concept
 Identity and change
 Mind/brain identity
 Ship of Theseus
 Narrative identity
 Vertiginous question

Continuity 
 Mindstream
 Consciousness
 Dependent origination
 Information-theoretic death
 Introspect
 Meme
 Mnemonic
 Percept
 Perdurantism
 Synchronicity
 Noumena
 Neuroplasticity (Spike-timing-dependent plasticity)
 Hebbian theory
 Dogen (being and time)
 process philosophy

People 
 Søren Kierkegaard
 Philip K. Dick
 Daniel Kolak
 Gottlob Frege
 Derek Parfit
 Trenton Merricks
 Anthony Quinton
 David Wiggins
 Sydney Shoemaker
 Bernard Williams
 Peter van Inwagen
 Carl Jung
 Erik Erikson
 Hugo Münsterberg
 Wilhelm Wundt
 Paul Ricœur
 James Marcia
 Mario Rodríguez Cobos

Other 
Identity and language learning, Metaphysical necessity, Otium, Personally identifiable information, Personal life, Privacy, immaterialism, Personhood, Gender systems (Social construction of gender difference), The Persistence of Memory (short story), The Persistence of Memory, Transhumanism

Notes

References

Further reading

Books

Articles

Online articles

External links 
 
 
 Personal Identity entry by Carsten Korfmacher in the Internet Encyclopedia of Philosophy
 Teaching material on personal identity, self, and applied ethics

Metaphysics of mind
Conceptions of self
Identity (philosophy)
Thought experiments in philosophy